The Athabasca Glacier  is one of the six principal 'toes' of the Columbia Icefield, located in the Canadian Rockies. Easily accessible, it is the most visited glacier in North America. The leading edge of the glacier is within easy walking distance; however, travel onto the glacier is not recommended unless properly equipped. Hidden crevasses have led to the deaths of unprepared tourists.

The Columbia Icefield Glacier Discovery Centre, closed during the winter (mid-October to mid-April), stands across from the glacier. It is used as a lodge and for ticket sales for sightseeing on the glacier. There are also two restaurants and a Starbucks located in the centre. Standard buses transport tourists from the centre to the glacier edge, where they board specially designed snow coaches for transport over the steep grades, snow and ice part way up the glacier.

Notable accidents
On 18 July 2020, a sightseeing snow coach rolled over on the glacier's moraine early in the afternoon, killing 3 passengers and injuring 24 others. Survivors were first airlifted by Parks Canada helicopters to a triage area. Nineteen of the occupants, 14 of whom suffered critical injuries, were then transported to the nearest hospitals via air and ground. In addition to countless first responders and EMS crews, three STARS helicopters from Calgary, Edmonton, and Grande Prairie responded to this multiple casualty incident.

On 5 October 2018, an employee of the sightseeing company died in the parking lot after suffering serious injuries when she was struck by her unmanned bus following a collision. The woman succumbed of her injuries upon arrival of the STARS air ambulance crew.

See also

List of glaciers in Canada
Athabasca

References

Further reading
 Kucera, Richard E. Probing the Athabasca Glacier: Case History of a Glacier in the Columbia Icefield [sic], Jasper National Park. Rev. and second printing. Evergreen Press, 1973, cop. 1972. 32, [2] p., ill. with b&w photos, graphs, and maps. N.B.: A bibliog. and the largest of the maps appear, respectively, on p. [33] and [34] (i.e., on the inside and outside the back cover).

External links
 Parks Canada entry

Gallery

Glaciers of Alberta
Canadian Rockies
Jasper National Park